The West End is a mostly residential area of Downtown Winnipeg, Manitoba, Canada. It includes the neighbourhoods of Armstrong's Point, Colony, Daniel McIntyre, Minto, Sargent Park, Spence, St. Matthews, West Broadway, and Wolseley.

The area is bordered by Route 62 (Osborne, Memorial, Colony, and Balmoral Streets) on the east, St. James Street on the west, the Assiniboine River on the south, and Notre Dame Avenue on the north.

Demographics

In 2011, the population of the West End was 46,140.

The area is ethnically diverse. Data from the 2011 census shows the West End as 51% Caucasian, 21% Filipino, 15% Aboriginal, 4% Black, and 9% other visible minorities. Historically, the area was home to large German, Scandinavian, and Icelandic communities.

Contrast between neighbourhoods in the West End is extreme. Armstrong's Point is one of Winnipeg's most affluent neighbourhoods with a median household income of $89,887; West Broadway is located directly north of Armstrong's Point, and has a median household income of $25,877.

Politics
Municipally, the West End is within both the Daniel McIntyre and Fort Rouge - East Fort Garry city council wards, which are represented by Cindy Gilroy and Sherri Rollins respectively.

Provincially, the electoral map of Manitoba was redrawn in 2019. The West End is now divided into the following four electoral districts, all represented by Manitoba NDP members: Wolseley (Lisa Naylor), St. James (Adrien Sala), Notre Dame (Malaya Marcelino), and Union Station (Uzoma Asagwara).

Federally, the West End is within the Winnipeg Centre electoral district and is represented by Leah Gazan (NDP).

Crime
The West End, much like the North End though to a lesser extent, is thought by Winnipeggers to be one of the more dangerous areas of the city. However, contrary to popular belief, much of the West End's neighborhoods have quite low crime rates, such as Sargent Park and Minto. With that being said, some of the neighborhoods in the West End do indeed possess some of the highest crime rates in the city, such as Spence and Colony. Generally speaking, the further west, the less crime.

The table below shows the crime rates of various crimes in each of the West End neighborhoods. The crime data spans 5 years from the year 2017 to the year 2021. The rates are crimes per 100,000 residents per year.

History

The development of the West End as a residential expansion came during one of Winnipeg's largest periods of growth between 1890–1895 and 1900–1912. The area was originally a part of the Parish of St. James until the boundary of the City of Winnipeg was extended to St. James Street from Maryland Street (formerly Boundary Road) in 1882. Development of the area as a working and middle class residential area began in the late 19th century and continued through the 1920s until the area was completely built up. The area developed rapidly due to its proximity to Downtown Winnipeg, and, unlike Winnipeg's North End, the mainline of the Canadian Pacific Railway did not impose a physical barrier between the West End and Downtown. The area was also well served by the city's street railway system with lines on Portage Avenue, Sargent Avenue, Sherbrook Street, and Arlington Street. The industrial area located adjacent to the railway spur between Wall and Erin Streets provided employment for many West End residents.

The West End was considered Ward Two in the old City of Winnipeg and was seen as the "swing riding" between the affluent and conservative Ward One and overwhelmingly socialist Ward Three, which comprised the North End and Elmwood.

Parts of the area declined in the years following World War II as many families moved to Winnipeg's suburbs and some of the housing stock was converted to rooming houses and became dilapidated. During the 1970s, crime became a serious problem in portions of the West End.

Since the 1980s, a notable revitalization of the neighbourhoods has been made. Numerous urban beautification projects have been undertaken and in 1987, the West End Cultural Centre was founded in an old church at Ellice Avenue and Sherbrook Street.

Much of the West End has experienced a sharp 'renaissance' in recent years. Average home price in the West End shot up 31% faster than Winnipeg's average between the years of 2000 to 2011. During this time frame, the average value of a West End home increased 12.4% year-over-year. In contrast, the average home value in the City of Winnipeg as a whole increased 9.5% year-over-year in that same time-frame.

Neighbourhoods 
The West End includes the following neighbourhoods:

 Armstrong's Point
 Colony
 Daniel McIntyre
 Minto
 Sargent Park
 Spence
 St. Matthews
 West Broadway
 Wolseley

Colony 
Colony takes its name from one of its main roads, Colony Street, which in turn was named for Colony Creek. In the early days of Winnipeg, Colony Creek drained a section of the prairie from near what is now Notre Dame Avenue to the river.

Daniel McIntyre 
The neighbourhood was named after Daniel McIntyre, a public official and educator credited with developing Winnipeg's school system. It is bounded to the north by Notre Dame Avenue, east by Victor Street, south by Ellice Avenue, and west by Ingersoll Street.

Minto 
The Minto neighbourhood was named for Governor-General of Canada Gilbert John Elliott Murray, Fourth Earl of Minto (1845-1914).

Spence 
The Spence neighbourhood derives its name from James Spence (1815-1900), a former cooper for the Hudson's Bay Company. Arriving at the Red River Colony in 1841, Spence bought land near the site of Fort Garry and was subsequently incorporated into the limits of the City of Winnipeg. The property included the section of the city north from Armstrong’s Point and west of Colony Street.

The Spence neighbourhood has the following boundaries:

 To the north is Notre Dame Avenue, from Victor to Balmoral Street.
 To the west, the boundary runs along Victor Street from Notre Dame to Portage Avenue.
 To the east, the boundary runs along Balmoral from Notre Dame to Ellice Avenue. On to Ellice, it continues west until Young Street, from where it goes south until Portage.
 To the south is Portage Avenue, from Victor and Young Street.

West Broadway 
As its name suggests, West Broadway encompasses the western portion of Winnipeg's Broadway area, as well as the western edge of downtown Winnipeg over all.

As with Broadway in general, West Broadway is one of Winnipeg’s oldest neighbourhoods, with its original homes being built around 1890 to 1913. West Broadway was originally a largely middle-class neighbourhood, located to the north of a small, wealthy enclave of Armstrong’s Point. During the post-war years, however, the once mixed-income community was met with poverty, crime, and a deteriorating housing stock from the 1960s onward.

Amenities
The area includes a Commemorative Plaza and Commemorative Mural on Valour Road, which honours World War I heroes Corporal Leo Clarke, Sergeant-Major Frederick William Hall, and Lieutenant Robert Shankland, who all grew up on the same city block of Valour Road (then known as Pine Street) and each received a Victoria Cross for bravery.

The Cindy Klassen Recreation Complex, named after local 6-time Olympic medalist Cindy Klassen, is a community fitness centre. It includes a swimming pool, water slide, sauna, weight room, fitness equipment, aerobic studio, indoor running track, outdoor skatepark, lawn bowling, sports fields, and a library, as well as a speed-skating oval in the winter.

The West End also includes more than 1000 businesses and organizations in the area, including over 150 restaurants. Ellice Avenue, Sherbrook Street, and Sargent Avenue East of Arlington have a large variety of ethnic restaurants and markets, being home to many Philippine, Vietnamese, Portuguese, Chinese, East Indian, Somali, Ethiopian, and Thai restaurants. Polo Park, the city's largest mall, is also considered part of the West End. The commercial area in the Polo Park district has expanded rapidly beginning in the 1990s with the building of big-box retail outlets, restaurants, and a major hotel. It has now supplanted downtown Winnipeg as the city's main commercial area.

Other attractions in the area include, the University of Winnipeg, Vimy Ridge Memorial Park, Omand's Creek and Park, Westview Park, and the Sargent Park Recreation Complex, as well as many houses, apartment buildings, schools, and an armoury with significant architectural merit. Portage Avenue is the site in the summer months of the "Sunday Night Cruise" by automobile enthusiasts, which while delighting the participants, raises the ire of many West End residents due to the noise, and the all too frequent practice of drag racing.

West End Cultural Centre 

The West End Cultural Centre (WECC), established in 1987, is the area's main hub for live music. It is located on Ellice Avenue in an 80-year-old church building, and is one of the "greenest live performance venues in Canada." It receives support from the federal Department of Canadian Heritage, the Government of Manitoba, Manitoba Arts Council, Winnipeg Arts Council, Assiniboine Credit Union, and the University of Manitoba's radio station, 101.5 UMFM.

Prior to the WECC, the building was occupied by:

 St. Matthews Church (1909-1912)
 Elim Chapel (1914-1928)
 St. Peter's Evangelical Lutheran Church (1931-1969)
 the Portuguese Association of Manitoba (1973-1987)

The Portuguese Association sold the building for CA$131,000 to Winnipeg Folk Festival founder Mitch Podoluck and Ava Kobrinsky, who had the vision of opening a community performing arts space, modeled on the Vancouver East Cultural Centre. Podoluck and Kobrinsky's project is what would become the West End Cultural Centre.

Murals 
With over 50 murals, the West End has one of the largest collections of outdoor murals in the city.

References

External links

 West End Business Improvement Zone

 
Neighbourhoods in Winnipeg
Downtown Winnipeg